Mete Horozoğlu (born 11 October 1975) is a Turkish actor.

Life and career 
Mete Horozoğlu was born in Ankara. His family were immigrants from Sarajevo who settled in Bursa. He spent his primary and secondary school years in Ankara and Yalova respectively, and later moved to Karamürsel to enroll in high school. In 2001, he graduated from Anadolu University State Conservatory with a degree in theatre studies. In 2010, he got his master's degree in advance acting from Bahçeşehir University.

Between 2001–2003, he worked at Theatre Anadolu in Eskişehir Anadolu University. After moving to Istanbul, he was cast in various movies and TV series. He worked as a stage actor for Istanbul State Theatre between 2003–2004, Çığır Sahnesi Oyuncuları between 2004–2005 and Semaver Company between 2005–2007.

He was first noted by the audience with his role in the Yanık Koza TV series. His popularity increased with his leading role in the movie Nefes: Vatan Sağolsunas Yüzbaşı Mete, and his breakthrough came with Öyle Bir Geçer Zaman ki, in which he played the role of Soner Talaşoğlu.

Filmography

Television

Film

Voice over

Awards and nominations

References

External links 
 

1975 births
Anadolu University alumni
Turkish male television actors
Turkish male film actors
Turkish male stage actors
Living people
Turkish people of Bosniak descent